Aldo Canazza (4 January 1908 – 21 October 2002) was an Italian racing cyclist. He rode in the 1932 Tour de France.

References

External links
 

1908 births
2002 deaths
Italian male cyclists
Place of birth missing
Cyclists from the Province of Padua